The 1995 French Supertouring Championship was won by Yvan Muller driving a BMW 318iS of Team BMW Fina.

Teams and drivers

Race calendar and results

 2 sessions, each qualifying session determines grid for each of two races (1st meeting only: grid of race 2 determined by race 1 result)

Championship standings
Scoring system

 15 results from 18 are valid for the championship

Drivers' Championship

Manufacturers' Trophy

Sources
 Touring Car World 95/96 — The official book of Touring car

References

Seasons in touring car racing
French Supertouring Championship